General elections were held in Jamaica on 16 October 2002. The result was a victory for the People's National Party, which won 34 of the 60 seats, whilst voter turnout was 59.1%. PNP leader P. J. Patterson retained his position as Prime Minister, becoming the first political leader to win three successive elections. Patterson stepped down on 26 February 2006, and was replaced by Portia Simpson-Miller, Jamaica's first female Prime Minister.

Results

References

2002 in Jamaica
Elections in Jamaica
Jamaica